Laage is a town and a municipality  in the Rostock district, in Mecklenburg-Vorpommern, Germany. It is situated on the river Recknitz, 23 kilometres southeast of Rostock. Rostock Laage Airport is located a few kilometres west of Laage. The former municipality Diekhof was merged into Laage in May 2019.

References

Laage
Cities and towns in Mecklenburg
Populated places established in the 1330s
1330s establishments in the Holy Roman Empire
1336 establishments in Europe